The World Health Organization (WHO) ranked the health systems of its 191 member states in its World Health Report 2000. It provided a framework and measurement approach to examine and compare aspects of health systems around the world. It developed a series of performance indicators to assess the overall level and distribution of health in the populations, and the responsiveness and financing of health care services. It was the organization's first ever analysis of the world's health systems.

Ranking

Methodology
The rankings are based on an index of five factors:
 Health (50%) : disability-adjusted life expectancy
 Overall or average : 25%
 Distribution or equality : 25%
 Responsiveness (25%) : speed of service, protection of privacy, and quality of amenities
 Overall or average : 12.5%
 Distribution or equality : 12.5%
 Fair financial contribution : 25%

Criticism

The WHO rankings are claimed to have been subject to many and varied criticisms since its publication. Concerns raised over the five factors considered, data sets used and comparison methodologies have led health bodies and political commentators in most of the countries on the list to question the efficacy of its results and validity of any conclusions drawn. Such criticisms of a broad endeavour by the WHO to rank all the world's healthcare systems must also however be understood in the context of a predisposition to analytical bias commensurate with an individual nation's demographics, socio-economics and politics. In considering such a disparate global spectrum, ranking criteria, methodology, results and conclusions will always be an area for contention.

In over a decade of discussion and controversy over the WHO Ranking of 2000, there is still no consensus about how an objective world health system ranking should be compiled. Indeed, the 2000 results have proved so controversial that the WHO declined to rank countries in their World Health Reports since 2000, but the debate still rages on. With burgeoning and ageing populations, spiralling costs and the recognition by most national governments that constant vigilance and periodic healthcare reform are necessary, the appetite for a means of measuring national performance in broader world contexts is ever increasing and all the more relevant. With this in mind, and in lieu of any further ranking information from the WHO since 2000, there are many analytical bodies now looking at national healthcare delivery in global contexts and publishing their findings. Bloomberg finds "the U.S. spends the most on health care on a relative cost basis with the worst outcome" and notes Cubans live longer than Americans, but Americans pay more than fourteen times as much for less effective health care. The Commonwealth Fund ranked seven developed countries on health care, the US ranked lowest(AU, CA, DE, NL, NZ, UK, US).

See also 
 Health systems – explains in some depth the concept of healthcare and its delivery on national and international scales
 International comparisons of health systems – a section of the above article specifically about international comparisons
 Healthcare subjects – a list of subjects detailing the complexities behind global healthcare delivery
 List of countries by quality of healthcare

References

External links 
 The World Health Organization's ranking of the world's health systems, by Rank

Health by country
World Health Organization